"The Way I Am" is a song written, produced, and performed by American rapper Eminem from his third album The Marshall Mathers LP (2000). It was released as the second single from the album on October 3, 2000, later being featured on his 2005 compilation album, Curtain Call: The Hits. In the tradition of most of Eminem's follow-up singles, "The Way I Am" is one of the rare songs for which he has sole songwriting credit. It features a much darker and emotionally driven sound than the album's lead single "The Real Slim Shady". "The Way I Am" peaked at number 58 on the Billboard Hot 100. Outside the United States, "The Way I Am" peaked within the top ten of the charts in Belgium (Wallonia), Finland, Netherlands, Ireland, Sweden, and United Kingdom.

Background
The song was written by Eminem to express the negative side of the fame that he had gained. The song makes points such as him not being able to go out in public and live a normal life due to him being harassed by fans. He also vents about the pressure put on him to top his earlier work on The Slim Shady LP. The song has also been remixed by Danny Lohner featuring Marilyn Manson, who has performed the song with Eminem live on stage. In 2005, it was re-released on the album Curtain Call: The Hits. "The Way I Am" was certified Gold in Sweden, selling over 20,000 copies.

In 2008, Eminem released a second autobiography titled The Way I Am.

Critical reception
The song received very positive reviews. Aspects lauded were the vocal delivery, rhyme pattern, production and political material covered. Cynthia Fuchs of PopMatters was positive: "In 'The Way I Am', Eminem expounds, 'Since birth I've been cursed with this curse to just curse / And just blurt this berserk and bizarre shit that works / And it sells and it helps in itself to relieve / All this tension, dispensin' these sentences.' So there it is: he's performing therapy." AllMusic highlighted the song. Sputnikmusic described this song as "Amityville's portrayal of the Detroit he grew up in; 'The Way I Am' as a whole". Same critic listed it in Recommended Downloads and praising the single: "Built over doomy, gothic arpeggios, rumbling bass, and church bells, Eminem lays down one of the most perfectly formed lyrics of his career, weaving in and out of a tight rhyme scheme that echoes the loping piano motif. Interesting aside: this is one of the first Eminem songs that gives him 100% of the writing credits." IGN praised the song: "Eminem is an angry ass white boy and the vitriol continues on 'The Way I Am', in which he soundly states 'I am whatever you say I am / If I wasn't why would I say I am?' And when he complains that he's 'so sick and tired of being admired...', one almost believes that he'll hang up the mic and disappear (but Em obviously loves the attention so that's not an option at this point in the game). The throbbing, tubular bell and piano laced beat only add to the intensity of the track (incidentally it was crafted by Em himself and it's one of the more stellar examples of his often hit or miss production techniques)." Sal Cinquemani called this song: "He (Eminem) revels in the fact that there's teen violence in upper-class cities on the epic 'The Way I Am'. The song was named the 35th Best Song of the decade by the magazine Complex. The same magazine, in April 2011, ranked the song at #3 on their 100 Best Eminem Songs list. The line, "If I wasn't, then why would I say I am" was taken from the song "As The Rhyme Goes On" by Eric B. & Rakim from the album Paid in Full .

Music video
The music video at the beginning plays an instrumental of his song "Kim", after the "Kim" instrumental is played, the song carries on as normal and when the song starts, it shows him on the point to advance forward to move on the wood window tablet of a very tall it shows him about to jump out the window of a tall building, and shows him falling through the sky, in a sequence inspired by the Coen brothers film The Hudsucker Proxy, in which the hero also falls slowly from a skyscraper window. Marilyn Manson appears behind Eminem when the song refers to him — and a few more times thereafter. Other shots show fans coming up to him, asking for his autograph, the scene when Eminem throws a chair at his Slim Shady LP platinum plaque was inspired by the pressure he felt by his label to write a hit as the first single for The Marshall Mathers LP. In the video, Proof is in the scene when Eminem makes a radio interview and flips the DJ off. Also, the little boy who asks for Eminem's photo in the public bathroom is his half-brother, Nathan. It was released by Paul Hunter as well as Eminem in his neighborhood in front of an old house. At the end of the video, when Eminem hits the ground, it bounces him safely like a giant mattress. It was named the 19th Best Music Video of the 2000s by Complex magazine. In the music video version of the song wind sound effects can be heard when Eminem is singing the intro, the first & last chorus. This can't be heard in the album version.

Credits
 Singing and lyrics : Eminem
 Production : Eminem
 Mixing : Eminem
 Guitar and bass : Mike Elizondo
 Keyboard : Mike Elizondo, Tommy Coster
 Composer : Marshall Mathers
 Executive Producer : Dr. Dre
 Producer Video : Nina Huang Fan
 Director : Paul Hunter
 Appearances in the clip: Marilyn Manson, Proof, Nathan Mathers

Track listing
UK CD single

UK Cassette

Australian CD single

Notes
 signifies a co-producer.

Charts

Weekly charts

Year-end charts

Certifications

References

External links

2000 singles
Eminem songs
Works about the Columbine High School massacre
Music videos directed by Paul Hunter (director)
Songs written by Eminem
Songs about the media
Song recordings produced by Eminem
Shady Records singles
Aftermath Entertainment singles
Interscope Records singles
2000 songs
American hip hop songs
Hardcore hip hop songs